Serbo-Croatian is a South Slavic language with four national standards. The Eastern Herzegovinian Neo-Shtokavian dialect forms the basis for Bosnian, Croatian, Montenegrin, and Serbian (the four national standards).

Standard Serbo-Croatian has 30 phonemes according to the traditional analysis: 25 consonants and 5 vowels (or 10, if long vowels are analysed as distinct phonemes). It features four types of pitch accent, although it is not the characteristics of all dialects.

Consonants
The consonant system of Serbo-Croatian has 25 phonemes. One peculiarity is a presence of both post-alveolar and palatal affricates, but a lack of corresponding palatal fricatives. Unlike most other Slavic languages such as Russian, there is no palatalized versus non-palatalized (hard–soft) contrast for most consonants.

  are dental, whereas  are alveolar.  become laminal denti-alveolar ,  before dental consonants.
  is palato-alveolar .
However, it does not interact with unvoiced consonants in clusters as a fricative would, and so is considered to be phonologically a sonorant (approximant) .
  are voiced  before voiced consonants.
  has more allophones:
  are retracted to  before .

 can be syllabic, short or long, and carry rising or falling tone, e.g.  ('blood'),  ('heart'),  ('deer'),  ('compassion'). It is typically realized by inserting a preceding or (more rarely) succeeding non-phonemic vocalic glide.

 is generally velarized or "dark" . Diachronically, it was fully vocalized into  in coda positions, as in past participle * >  ('worked'). In some dialects, notably Torlakian and Kajkavian that process did not take place, and  can be syllabic as well.

The retroflex consonants  are, in more detailed phonetic studies, described as apical .

Alveolo-palatal fricatives  are marginal phonemes, usually realized as consonant clusters .

Voicing contrasts are neutralized in consonant clusters, so that all obstruents are either voiced or voiceless depending on the voicing of the final consonant, though this process of voicing assimilation may be blocked by syllable boundaries.

Vowels

The Serbo-Croatian vowel system is symmetrically composed of five vowel qualities . Although the difference between long and short vowels is phonemic, it is not represented in standard orthography, as it is in Czech or Slovak orthography, except in dictionaries. Unstressed vowels are shorter than the stressed ones by 30% (in the case of short vowels) and 50% (in the case of long vowels).

The long Ijekavian reflex of Proto-Slavic jat is of disputed status. The prescriptive grammar  published by the foremost Croatian normative body—the Institute of Croatian Language and Linguistics, describes it as a diphthong, but this norm has been heavily criticized by phoneticians as having no foundation in the spoken language, the alleged diphthong being called a "phantom phoneme". Thus the reflex of long jat, which is spelled as a trigraph  in standard Croatian, Bosnian and Ijekavian Serbian, represents the sequence .

Stressed vowels carry one of the two basic tones, rising and falling.

Pitch accent

New Shtokavian dialects (which form the basis of the standard language) allow two tones on stressed syllables and have distinctive vowel length and so distinguish four combinations, called pitch accent: short falling (ȅ), short rising (è), long falling (ȇ), and long rising (é).

Most speakers from Serbia and Croatia do not distinguish between short rising and short falling tones. They also pronounce most unstressed long vowels as short, with some exceptions, such as genitive plural endings. Several Southern Serbian dialects, notably the dialect of Niš, lack vowel length and pitch accent, instead using a stress based system, as well as differing from the standard language in stress placement. These are considered barbarisms which leads to varying degrees of code switching.

The accent can be on any syllable, but rarely on the last syllable. This is relevant for Serbia, where educated speakers otherwise speak close to standard Serbian in professional contexts; this is less so in Croatia, where educated speakers often use a local Croatian variant which might have a quite different stress system. For example, even highly educated speakers in Zagreb will have no tones, and can have stress on any syllable.

Accent alternations are very frequent in inflectional paradigms, in both quality and placement in the word (the so-called "mobile paradigms", which were present in Proto-Indo-European itself and became much more widespread in Proto-Balto-Slavic). Different inflected forms of the same lexeme can exhibit all four accents:   ('pot' nominative sg.),   (genitive singular),   (nominative plural),   (genitive plural).

Research done by Pavle Ivić and Ilse Lehiste has shown that all stressed syllables of Serbo-Croatian words are basically spoken with a high tone and that native speakers rely on the phonetic tone of the first post-tonic syllable to judge the pitch accent of any given word. If the high tone of the stressed syllable is carried over to the first post-tonic syllable, the accent is perceived as rising. If it is not, the accent is perceived as falling, which is the reason monosyllabic words are always perceived as falling. Ivić and Lehiste were not the first scholars to notice this; in fact,  made a very similar discovery decades earlier, but it was ignored due to him being a foreigner and because it contradicted the Vukovian approach, which was then already well-ingrained.

Although distinctions of pitch occur only in stressed syllables, unstressed vowels maintain a length distinction. Pretonic syllables are always short, but posttonic syllables may be either short or long. These are traditionally counted as two additional accents. In the standard language, the six accents are realized as follows:

There can be more than one post-accent length in a word, notably in genitive plural of nouns:  ('cubes') →  ('cubes''). Realization of the accents varies by region.

Restrictions on the distribution of the accent depend, beside the position of the syllable, also on its quality, as not every kind of accent can be manifested in every syllable.
 Falling tone generally occurs in monosyllabic words or the first syllable of a word ( ('belt'),  ('horn');  ('old woman'),  ('river ship');  ('small house'), . The only exception to this rule are interjections, words uttered in the state of excitement (such as)
 Rising tone generally occurs in any syllable of a word except the last one and so never occurs in monosyllabics ( 'water',  'harbour';  'meadow',  'slamming';  'orphan',  'beginning';  'wormhole',  'liberation').

Thus, monosyllabics generally have falling tone, and polysyllabics generally have falling or rising tone on the first syllable and rising in all the other syllables but the last one. The tonal opposition rising ~ falling is hence generally possible only in the first accented syllable of polysyllabic words, and the opposition by lengths, long ~ short, is possible in the accented syllable, as well as in the postaccented syllables (but not in a preaccented position).

Proclitics, clitics that latch on to a following word, on the other hand, may "steal" a falling tone (but not a rising tone) from the following monosyllabic or disyllabic word. The stolen accent is always short and may end up being either falling or rising on the proclitic. The phenomenon (accent shift to proclitic) is most frequent in the spoken idioms of Bosnia, as in Serbian it is more limited (normally with the negation proclitic  and it is almost absent from Croatian Neo-Shtokavian idioms. Such a shift is less frequent for short rising accents than for the falling one (as seen in this example:  → ).

Morphophonemic alternations
Serbo-Croatian exhibits a number of morphophonological alternations. Some of them are inherited from Proto-Slavic and are shared with other Slavic languages, and some of them are exclusive to Serbo-Croatian, representing later innovation.

Fleeting a
The so-called "fleeting a", or "movable a", refers to the phenomenon of short /a/ making apparently random appearance and loss in certain inflected forms of nouns. This is a result of different types of reflexes Common Slavic jers */ъ/ and */ь/, which in Štokavian and Čakavian dialects merged to one schwa-like sound, which was lost in a weak position and vocalized to */a/ in a strong position, giving rise to what is apparently unpredictable alternation. In most of the cases, this has led to such /a/ appearing in word forms ending in consonant clusters, but not in forms with vowel ending.

The "fleeting a" is most common in the following cases:
 in nominative singular, accusative singular for inanimate nouns, and genitive plural for certain type of masculine nouns:
  ('fighter' nom. sg.) –  (gen. sg.) –  (gen. pl.)
  ('young man' nom. sg.) –  (gen. sg.) –  (gen. pl.)
  ('chair' nom. sg.) –  (gen. sg.) –  (gen. pl.)
 in genitive plural forms of feminine nouns ending in a consonant cluster:
  ('board') – ,  ('sister') – ,  ('barrel') – 
 in nominative singular indefinite masculine forms of adjectives and pronouns:
  ('short') – ,  ('what kind of') – ,  ('entire') –

Palatalization

The reflex of the Slavic first palatalization was retained in Serbo-Croatian as an alternation of
  → 
  → 
  → 
before  in inflection, and before  and some other segments in word formation. This alternation is prominently featured in several characteristic cases:

 in vocative singular of masculine nouns, where it is triggered by the ending -e:
  ('hero') → ,   ('devil') → ,   ('walnut') → .
 in the present stem of certain verbs before the endings in :
  ('to bake') – present stem ;  ('I bake'), but  ('they bake') without palatalization before the 3rd person plural ending 
  ('to shear') – present stem ;  ('I shear'), but  ('they shear') without palatalization before the 3rd person plural ending 
  ('can – present stem') ;  ('you can'), but  ('I can'), without the palatalization before the archaic 1st person singular ending 
 in aorist formation of some verbs:
 in derivation of certain classes of nouns and verbs:
  ('torment') →  ('to torment');  ('air') →  ('to air'),   ('trace') →  ('to seek')
  ('servant') →  ('to serve'),   ('the sense of smell') →  ('to smell')
 before the "fleeting a", and before the endings  and several others:
  ('breath') →  ('puff'),  ('Carthage') →  ('Carthaginian'),  ('god') →  ('god's'),  ('fear') →  ('fearsome')
Such palatals have often been leveled out in various derived forms. For example:
  ('uncle') –  ('uncle!') –  ('uncle's'),  ('hunter') –  ('hunter!') –  ('hunter's'),  ('hare') –  ('hare!') –  ('hares'),  ('street') –  ('alley'),  ('bird') –  ('small bird') –  ('big bird')
  ('knight') –  ('knight!'),  ('prince') –  ('prince!')

There are some exceptions to the process of palatalization. The conditions are:
 before the diminutive suffix 
  ('cat') →  ('kitten'),  ('freckle') →  ('small freckle'),  ('flea') →  ('small flea')
 before the possessive suffix  in adjectives derived from hypocoristic nouns:
  ('grandma') →  ('grandma's'),  ('bunny') →  ('bunny's'),  ('kitty') →  ('kitty's')
Doublets exist with adjectives derived with suffix  from trisyllabic proper names:
  →  : ,  →  : ,  →  :

Sibilantization

The output of the second and the third Slavic palatalization is in the Serbo-Croatian grammar tradition known as "sibilantization" (sibilarizácija/сибилариза́ција). It results in the following alternations before :
  → 
  → 
  → 
This alternation is prominently featured in several characteristic cases:
  ('to bake' present stem) ;  ('bake!' 2nd person singular imperative)
  ('to shear' present stem) ;  ('shear!' 2nd person singular imperative)
  ('to thresh' present stem) ;  ('thresh!' 2nd person singular imperative)
 in masculine nominative plurals with the ending :
  ('hero') → 
  ('jug') → 
  ('draught [of air]') → 
 in dative and locative singular of a-stem nouns (prevalently feminine):
  ('mother') → 
  ('leg') → 
  ('daughter-in-law') → 
 in dative, locative and instrumental plural of masculine o-stems:
  ('hero') → 
  ('jug') → 
 in the formation of imperfective verbs to perfective verbs:
  ('to lift') –  ('to do lifting')
  ('to sigh') –  ('to do sighing') but first-person singular present:  ('I sigh')

In two cases there is an exception to sibilantization:
 in nominative singular of masculine nouns:
 in monosyllabic borrowings:
  ('Basque') →,  ('bronchus') → ,  → 
 in anthroponyms in plural form, usually from a region where Kajkavian dialect is spoken:
  ('Czechs'),  ('Novaks')
 some surnames that are not identical to some general noun of the standard language:
  → ,  → 
 with nouns having 'fleeting a' in the ending 
  → 
 in dative and locative case of feminine and masculine a-stems
 in hypocorisms:
  ('grandmother') → ,  ('little sister') → ,  ('little brother') →,  ('bunny') → ,  ('uncle [affectionate]') → 
 in words whose stem ends in a single consonant:
  ('blanket') →,  ('hook') →,  ('colleague') →,  ('freckle') →,  ('supply') →
 in names and surnames
  → ,  → ,  → 
  ('cube') →,  ('point') →,  ('sling') →,  ('slap') →,  ('duck') →,  ('mule') →
 in many toponyms:
  → ,  ('Carthage') → 
 in nouns ending in suffix  with stem-final sonorant:
  ('an intellectual' feminine) →,  ('Kajkavian speaker' feminine) →,  ('high school girl') →

Doublets are allowed in the following cases:
 nominative plural of some masculine borrowings:
  →  : 
 in nominative plural of surnames who are identical with some general masculine noun:
  →  : ,  →  : 
 in nominative plural of masculine nouns with "fleeting a" and the ending ,  or 
  ('cat' masculine) → : ,  ('ephod') → : ,  →  : 
 in dative and locative of some feminine toponyms with stem ending in a single consonant:
 
  ('Alaska') → , 
  ('goose') →,  ('battle') →,  ('blade of grass') →

Iotation

Assimilation
There are two types of consonant assimilation: by voicing and by place of articulation.

Assimilation of voice

All consonants in clusters are neutralized by voicing, but Serbo-Croatian does not exhibit final-obstruent devoicing as most other Slavic languages do. Assimilation is practically always regressive, i.e. voicing of the group is determined by voicing of the last consonant. Sonorants are exempted from assimilation, so it affects only the following consonants:

 
  ('hawk') → :  (nominative → genitive, with fleeting a)
  ('cannon') +  →  :  ('cannonman')
 

  ('burek') +  →  :  ('burek-baker')
 
  ('under-') +  ('pay') →  :  ('to bribe')

 

  ('sorcerer') +  →  :  ('witchcraft')
  ('learn-') +  →  :  ('textbook')
 
  ('heavy') → :  (singular → plural, with fleeting a)

 
  ('narrow') → :  (singular → plural, with fleeting a)
  ('off-') +  ('throw') → :  ('throw off')

Furthermore,  and  don't have voiced counterparts, so they trigger the assimilation, but are not affected by it.

As can be seen from the examples above, assimilation is generally reflected in orthography. However, there are numerous orthographic exceptions, i.e. even if voicing or devoicing does take place in speech, the orthography does not record it, usually to maintain the etymology clearer.

Assimilation by place of articulation

 
  ('dog') +  ('small dog')
  ('leaf') +  ('leaves')
  ('to beg') +  ('begging')
  ('to bear') +  ('bearable')
 
  ('dowry') +  ('girl with dowry')
  ('grape bunch') +  ('grapes')
  ('to care') +  ('care')
  ('to care') +  ('careful')

Simultaneously, assimilation by voicing is triggered if necessary.

L-vocalization

A historical  in coda position has become  and is now so spelled, and produces an additional syllable. However, in Croatian, the process is partially reversed; compare Croatian  vs. Serbian  ('table', 'ox' and 'salt').

Sample
The sample text is a reading of the first sentence of The North Wind and the Sun by a 57-year-old female announcer at the Croatian Television Network reading in a colloquial style.

Phonemic transcription

Phonetic transcription

Orthographic version (Ijekavian)
Sjeverni ledeni vjetar i Sunce su se prepirali o svojoj snazi.

See also
 Differences between Serbo-Croatian standard varieties
 IPA/Serbo-Croatian
 Language secessionism in Serbo-Croatian
 Pluricentric Serbo-Croatian language
 Serbo-Croatian grammar
 Serbo-Croatian kinship
 Serbo-Croatian language
 Serbo-Croatian relative clauses
 Shtokavian dialect
 South Slavic dialect continuum
 Standard language
 Montenegrin alphabet

Notes

References

Literature

 
 
 

 
 
 
 
  [Grammar book]. Contents. Summary

Further reading

External links
 Croatian for travellers, with audio files

Bosnian language
Croatian language
Montenegrin language
Serbian language
Serbo-Croatian language
Slavic phonologies